Amanda Gabrielle Brown (born 17 November 1965) is an Australian composer, classically trained musician, singer and songwriter known for her role as the violinist of the band The Go-Betweens and more recently a session musician and soundtrack composer.

Career

1980s
Brown's early bands during the early 1980s were Climbing Frame, Tender Mercies (with John Willsteed, also later with The Go-Betweens) and Blood Brothers, in which she played violin, oboe, guitar and keyboards. In 1986, The Go-Betweens – soon after signing a new contract (this time with Beggars Banquet) – discovered Amanda Brown playing live in a café. She later joined the band in London, her addition expanding the line-up to a five-piece, for which she provided backing vocals, violin, oboe, guitar and keyboards and arrangements.

Brown played on two studio albums, Tallulah (1987) and 16 Lovers Lane (1988). The Go-Betweens toured for 18 months following the release of 16 Lovers Lane, ending in Munich, Germany. They broke up in December 1989, after a farewell tour of England.

1990s
Following the break-up of The Go-Betweens, Brown formed the band Cleopatra Wong (1991–1992), with Go-Betweens drummer Lindy Morrison, resulting in two marginally successful mini-CDs on the rooArt label, Egg and Cleopatra's Lament, including the single (and video) "Thank You". During this period, she also undertook session work with Tactics, the  Shane Howard Band, Wayne Gillespie and Wendy Matthews’s band and sang back-up vocals on former Go-Betweens member Grant McLennan's 1991 debut album Watershed.

Later work included playing with Sydney band Love Me (1997–1998) and diverse session appearances with artists including R.E.M., The Reels, Died Pretty, Silverchair, David Bridie, David Lane, The Cruel Sea, The Apartments, and Boxcar (on the album Algorhythm).

Brown was the first ever musician to guest host the music video programme RAGE, on ABC TV, in February 1990.

2000s
A graduate of the Australian Film Television and Radio School, Brown has established a career as a screen composer, writing for television and film soundtracks. In 2003 she released the Incognita soundtrack CD, a mixture of songs and instrumentals accompanying a performance by the Stalker Theatre Company. The performance of Incognita toured Australia and Europe, commencing at the Sydney Festival 2003, and the show explored issues of Australia's past and present.

Brown has composed scores for feature films, including Preservation (2003), Floodhouse (2003), Look Both Ways (2005) Monkey Puzzle  (2007) and Son of a Lion (2008). Documentaries she has composed the music for include Suburb For Sale (2006) and A Well Founded Fear (2008).

Brown is also the occasional 'sixth' member of Toni Collette's live band, The Finish, and has continued to record and perform with various artists including The Vines, Youth Group and Josh Pyke. In the winter 2007–08 she duetted with the Danish singer Michael Møller on the song "A Sunday Routine" from his debut solo outing from his band Moi Caprice.

In 2008 Brown won the IF Inside Film Award for Best Music for her score of Son of a Lion. A soundtrack album was released in late 2008. In 2009 she won the APRA/Australian Guild of Screen Composers Award for Best Music in a Documentary for the score of Sidney Nolan: Mask and Memory.

Brown continues to diversify; in 2009 she mixed David Lane's album Head in the Clouds.

On her 50th birthday in 2015, Brown was elected to the APRA Board as a Writer Director.

In 2020 Brown composed the soundtrack for the documentary, Brazen Hussies. She is currently recording her first-ever solo album of original material.

Persona life
Brown resides in the Sydney suburb of Maroubra with partner Simon Marnie.

Discography

Albums

Awards and nominations

ARIA Music Awards
The ARIA Music Awards is an annual awards ceremony that recognises excellence, innovation, and achievement across all genres of Australian music. They commenced in 1987. 

! 
|-
| 2009
| Son of a Lion
| Best Original Soundtrack, Cast or Show Album
| 
|rowspan="2" | 
|-

Further reading
 David Nichols (2003) "The Go-Betweens" Puncture Publications 
 Robert Forster (2016) "Grant & I: Inside and Outside the Go-Betweens" Penguin Books Australia

References

External links
 Amanda Brown discography
 

1965 births
Living people
APRA Award winners
Australian women composers
Australian women singer-songwriters
Australian Film Television and Radio School alumni
Australian violinists
Rock violinists
21st-century violinists
The Go-Betweens members
Australian autoharp players
Australian oboists
Australian mandolinists
Australian keyboardists